Serendipity "Ren" Gottlieb is a fictional character from the Australian television soap opera Neighbours, played by Raelee Hill. She made her first appearance during the episode broadcast on 25 August 1994. Serendipity was introduced as the sister of Stephen Gottlieb (Lochie Daddo) and Mark Gottlieb (Bruce Samazan). She is a hippy who arrives in Erinsborough to see Mark. During her time in the show she becomes good friends with Sam Kratz (Richard Grieve) and Annalise Hartman (Kimberley Davies), is almost beaten up by her boyfriend, becomes a designer and gets engaged to Luke Handley (Bernard Curry). Hill quit the role in 1995 and her final scenes as Serendipity aired on 7 September 1995.

Casting
In 1994, Network Ten told TV Week that they would be introducing a "younger, livelier look with six regular characters under the age of 18". Shortly after that announcement, Serendipity was introduced. Hill revealed that she was spotted by Neighbours''' casting director, Jan Russ, during a break from filming on Blue Heelers. Hill said "We got talking and she asked me to audition for the role of Serendipity Gottlieb." Hill later said "Apparently, I looked exactly how they imagined Serendipity to look so she suggested that I audition for the part and I got the job!"

Development
The character's fictional backstory explained that she enjoyed living in the hippy communes with her parents when she was younger, and she retains her beliefs in the healing properties of crystals and rebirth. Author of Neighbours: The First 10 Years, Josephine Monroe described Ren as "one of life's free spirits" and wrote that she is ruled by her heart rather than her head. Hill said her character and her siblings all had a "fantastic upbringing" and that Ren is a "real bohemian and has a really great collection of crushed velvet smocks". Hill also said that playing Ren was "like taking a trip down memory lane" as she had been into the hippy lifestyle when she was a teenager. Ren "brought a breath of fresh air" into her brother, Mark's life. Their contemporary home decor reflected their personalities, and Andrew Anastasios of The Age wrote: "They are younger, less conservative, and Ren is 'a hippy fashion designer'." When Ren begins working with Danni Stark (Eliza Szonert) on her fashion business, her personality begins to change. She starts driving a BMW and "the power goes to her head."

Writers established a romantic relationship between Ren and her housemate Luke Handley (Bernard Curry). The pair end up kissing after Ren helps Luke out as he is hassled by a group of men at the Coffee Shop. Of the development, Hill explained "They end up falling into bed together that evening. When they wake up the next morning, they realise that their relationship has changed forever." Jason Herbison of Inside Soap observed that the couple should take things slowly, as it is awkward for friends to become lovers. However, in the storyline, Ren is so "certain about her feelings for Luke" that she is ready to tell everyone about their relationship. She later suggests they continue having sex, but also date other people, which Luke has doubts about. Hill pointed out that Luke finds it hard to make a commitment as the death of his younger sister has led him afraid to get close to anyone. The storyline led to the departure of Hill's character and temporary departure of Handley's. Ren and Luke work out their differences and get engaged. They leave Erinsborough for Japan, where Luke has been offered a job.

After quitting Neighbours in 1995, Hill said that she was concentrating on her other interests, such as singing and dancing. She also attended auditions for several films. Hill admitted that she did not want to take on another soap opera role at the time, unless it was for a guest appearance. She added that she spoke with the producer of Neighbours and told her that she would be interested in coming back one day, especially as Ren's story with Luke is left unresolved.

Storylines
Serendipity arrives in Erinsborough after she had been working as a nanny in Amsterdam. The last time she had seen her brothers was at their mother's funeral. Mark is happy to have his sister around. Mark and Rick Alessi (Dan Falzon) are looking for a new housemate and Serendipity moves in straight away.

Serendipity strikes up a friendship with Sam Kratz (Richard Grieve) and they grow close. Sam meets Chip Kelly (Martin Crewes) through the Erinsborough football team and he and Serendipity begin a relationship. Chip suffers from mood swings and Karl Kennedy (Alan Fletcher) wonders if he is abusing steroids. Serendipity comes to the same realisation when she tries to stop his advances and he gets violent. Serendipity narrowly manages to escape without injury. When Serendipity gets home she tells the story to Sam, Mark and Annalise Hartman (Kimberley Davies). Sam goes and beats Chip up, which Serendipity disapproves of. Serendipity and Annalise then start up self-defence classes for the residents of Ramsay Street.

Serendipity helps to repair other people's relationships. She acts as a go-between for Rick and Cody Willis (Peta Brady) and Mark and Annalise. Her hippy background proves to be useful for Brett Stark (Brett Blewitt) when she helps him make a love potion in his quest to win Libby Kennedy's (Kym Valentine) heart. Serendipity agrees to be one of Annalise's bridesmaids at her wedding to Mark. Serendipity proves to be a friend for both her brother and Annalise after their wedding is called off, following Mark's revelation that he wants to become a priest.

Serendipity and Danni Stark begin making jewellery and start selling it. They build their business up after demand grows and Serendipity begins dating Kingston White (Simon Wilton). Serendipity begins to change and becomes very driven by business and making money. She and Danni get involved in the fashion world, but when Serendipity discovers that their clothes are being created in an illegal sweat shop, she is horrified. Serendipity breaks down and rips up her designs. Mark supports her during this time, as does Luke Handley. Serendipity realises that she is not cut out for the fashion industry and goes back to her old self. She also strikes up a friendship with Lucy Robinson (Melissa Bell). Serendipity and Luke begin a relationship, but they both find it difficult to take the step from friends to lovers. Mark falls from the roof of Number 22 and ends up in a coma, this reunites Serendipity and Luke and Luke proposes. Serendipity is shocked, but she accepts. Luke is offered a job in Japan and Serendipity decides to go with him. Their relationship does not last and Luke eventually returns to Erinsborough.

Reception
The BBC said Serendipity's most notable moment was "Discovering a sweat shop for illegal immigrants and shutting it down." Jessica Adams from The Sun-Herald said Serendipity's name was "freakish."

References

External links
Serendipity Gottlieb at the Official Neighbours'' website
Serendipity Gottlieb at BBC Online

Neighbours characters
Fictional nannies
Television characters introduced in 1994
Female characters in television